Æ (lowercase: æ) is a character formed from the letters a and e, originally a ligature representing the Latin diphthong ae. It has been promoted to the status of a letter in some languages, including Danish, Norwegian, Icelandic, and Faroese. It was also used in Old Swedish before being changed to ä. The modern International Phonetic Alphabet uses it to represent the near-open front unrounded vowel (the sound represented by the 'a' in the English word cat). Diacritic variants include Ǣ/ǣ, Ǽ/ǽ, Æ̀/æ̀, Æ̂/æ̂ and Æ̃/æ̃.

As a letter of the Old English Latin alphabet, it was called , "ash tree", after the Anglo-Saxon futhorc rune ᚫ which it transliterated; its traditional name in English is still ash, or æsh if the ligature is included.

Languages

Latin
In Classical Latin, the combination AE denotes the diphthong , which had a value similar to the long i in fine as pronounced in most dialects of Modern English. Both classical and present practice is to write the letters separately, but the ligature was used in medieval and early modern writings, in part because æ was reduced to the simple vowel  during the Roman Empire. In some medieval scripts, the ligature was simplified to ę, an e with ogonek, called the e caudata (Latin for "tailed e"). That was further simplified into a plain e, which may have influenced or been influenced by the pronunciation change. However, the ligature is still relatively common in liturgical books and musical scores.

French
In the modern French alphabet, æ (called a "" ("e in the a")) is used to spell Latin and Greek borrowings like curriculum vitæ, et cætera, ex æquo, tænia, and the first name Lætitia. It is mentioned in the name of Serge Gainsbourg's song Elaeudanla Téïtéïa, a reading of the French spelling of the name Lætitia: "L, A, E dans l'A, T, I, T, I, A."

English

In English, usage of the ligature varies between different places and contexts, but it is fairly rare. In modern typography, if technological limitations make the use of æ difficult (such as in use of typewriters, telegraphs, or ASCII), the digraph ae is often used instead.

In the United States, the issue of the ligature is sidestepped in many cases by use of a simplified spelling with "e", as happened with œ as well. Usage, however, may vary; for example, medieval is now more common than mediaeval (and the now old-fashioned mediæval) even in the United Kingdom, but archaeology is preferred over archeology, even in the US.

Given their long history, ligatures are sometimes used to show archaism or in literal quotations of historic sources; for instance, in those contexts, words such as dæmon and æther are often so spelled.

The ligature is seen on gravestones of the 19th century, short for ætate ("at the age (of)"): "Æ xxYs, yyMs, zzDs." It is also common in formal typography (invitations, resolutions, announcements, and some government documents); for example, the Court Circular has continued to use the spelling orthopædic well into the 21st century.

In numismatics, "Æ" is used as an abbreviation for "bronze", derived from the Latin aes (aere in the ablative, "from bronze").

In Old English, æ represented a sound between a and e, very much like the short a of cat in many dialects of Modern English. If long vowels are distinguished from short vowels, the long version  is marked with a macron (ǣ) or, less commonly, an acute (ǽ).

Other Germanic languages
In Old Norse, æ represents the long vowel .

In most varieties of Faroese, æ is pronounced as follows:
 when simultaneously stressed and occurring either word-finally, before a vowel letter, before a single consonant letter, or before the consonant-letter groups kl, kr, pl, pr, tr, kj, tj, sj, and those consisting of ð and one other consonant letter, except for ðr when pronounced like gr (except as below)
 in all other cases

 (eider): Southern , Northern Faroese 
 (family, direction): Southern , Northern Faroese 

In Icelandic, æ represents the diphthong , which can be long or short.

In Danish and Norwegian, æ is a separate letter of the alphabet that represents a monophthong. It follows z and precedes ø and å. In Norwegian, there are four ways of pronouncing the letter:

Thus, when this word is written as it is pronounced in these dialects (rather than the standard), it is often spelled with the letter "æ".

In western and southern Jutish dialects of Danish,  is also the proclitic definite article:  (the house), as opposed to Standard Danish and all other Nordic varieties which have enclitic definite articles (Danish, Swedish,; Icelandic, Faroese:  [the house]).

In German, it is not a separate letter from "A" but in Swedish and Finnish, it is the second-to-last letter (between å and ö).

In the normalized spelling of Middle High German,  represents a long vowel . The actual spelling in the manuscripts varies, however.

Ossetic

Ossetic used the letter æ when it was written using the Latin script from 1923 to 1938. Since then, Ossetian has used a Cyrillic alphabet with an identical-looking letter (Ӕ and ӕ). It is pronounced as a mid-central vowel (schwa).

South American languages
The letter æ is used in the official orthography of Kawésqar spoken in Chile and also in that of the Fuegian language Yaghan.

International Phonetic Alphabet
The symbol  is also used in the International Phonetic Alphabet (IPA) to denote a near-open front unrounded vowel like in the word cat in many dialects of Modern English, which is the sound that was most likely represented by the Old English letter. In the IPA, it is always in lowercase.  is a superscript IPA letter

The Uralic Phonetic Alphabet (UPA) uses four additional æ-related symbols, see Unicode table below.

Cyrillic

The Latin letters are frequently used in place of the Cyrillic Ӕ and ӕ in Cyrillic texts (such as on Ossetian sites on the Internet).

Typing the character

X:  and  can be used.
In all versions of the Mac OS (Systems 1 through 7, Mac OS 8 and 9, OS X, macOS 11 and 12, and the current macOS 13): æ:  (apostrophe key), Æ: .
On the iPhone, iPod touch and iPad, as well as phones running Google's Android OS or Windows Mobile OS and on the Kindle Touch and Paperwhite: hold down "A" until a small menu is displayed.
The Icelandic keyboard layout has a separate key for Æ (and Ð, Þ and Ö).
The Norwegian keyboard layout also has a separate key for Æ, rightmost of the letters, to the right of Ø and below Å.
In Vim the digraph is 'AE' for Æ and 'ae' for æ. (Press Ctrl-K in Insert mode.)

Unicode

See also

Footnotes

Notes

References

Further reading

Robert Bringhurst (2002). The Elements of Typographic Style, page 271. Vancouver, Hartley & Marks. 

Latin-script ligatures
Phonetic transcription symbols
E
E
E
E
E
Old English
Vowel letters
Latin-script letters